Bahador Abdi (born on 1 May 1984 in Tehran) is an Iranian football midfielder who currently plays for Aluminium Arak in the Azadegan League.

Club career

Club Career Statistics
Last Update  7 August 2014 

 Assist Goals

International career
He started his international career under head coach Afshin Ghotbi in November 2010 against Nigeria.

Honours
Iran's Premier Football League Winner: 1
2007–08 with Persepolis

References

Iranian footballers
Persian Gulf Pro League players
Azadegan League players
Persepolis F.C. players
Shahin Bushehr F.C. players
Sportspeople from Tehran
1984 births
Living people
Rah Ahan players
Association football midfielders